The Mongolian People's Party (MPP) is a social democratic political party in Mongolia. It was founded as a communist party in 1920 by Mongolian revolutionaries and is the oldest political party in Mongolia.

The party played an important role in the Mongolian Revolution of 1921, which was inspired by the Bolsheviks' October Revolution. Following independence, it governed Mongolia as a one-party socialist state. The party changed its name to the Mongolian People's Revolutionary Party (MPRP) and joined the Communist International in 1924.

As the MPRP, the party was organized on the basis of democratic centralism, a principle conceived by Vladimir Lenin which entails democratic and open discussion on policy on the condition of unity in upholding the agreed upon policies. The highest body of the party was the Party Congress, convened every fifth year. When the Party Congress was not in session, the Central Committee was the highest body, but since they met normally only once a year, most duties and responsibilities are vested in the Politburo and its Standing Committee. The party's leader has been titled General Secretary, Chairman, Secretary, and First Secretary. The party previously followed Marxism-Leninism, a synthesis of the ideas of Karl Marx and Lenin introduced by Joseph Stalin in 1929, under which the industries of Mongolia were nationalized and a planned economy was implemented.

Following the Mongolian Revolution of 1990, other political parties in Mongolia were legalised and the country transitioned into a multi-party democracy. The party subsequently abandoned Marxism–Leninism in favour of democratic socialism. In 2010, party members voted to adopt social democracy as the party's ideology and restore the party's original name, dropping the word "revolutionary". This caused a faction to split away and form a new party to retain the long-standing name; the two parties reunited in 2021.

The party remained as Mongolia's governing party after the 1990 revolution, until it was defeated in the 1996 election. From 2004 to 2008, it was a part of a coalition government with the Democratic Party and Motherland Party. From 2008 to 2012, the party participated in another coalition with the Democratic Party, although it had a majority in the Mongolian legislature. It became the main opposition party after the 2012 election. The party returned to power following the 2016 election and retained its majority in the 2020 election.

History

Background
In 1911, Outer Mongolia declared its independence from the Qing dynasty after over two centuries of Qing rule. However, the independence of the Bogd Khanate did not last since it was not recognized by its two neighbors (Russia and China) and was considered an autonomous region under Chinese sovereignty or suzerainty. In 1919, Mongolia was invaded by the Chinese Beiyang government and by White Russian forces in 1921.

1921 revolution

During the occupation two groups, known as the Consular Hill (Konsulyn denj) and East Khuree (Züün khüree), formed as resistance movements. On 25 June 1920, the groups united as the Mongolian People's Party and decided to send seven representatives to the Soviet Union, who met with Soviet representatives in Irkutsk in August. On 1 March 1921, the party formed in Kyakhta (claiming to be Mongolia's first political party) and formed a provisional government.

On 18 March, the Mongolian People's Army under Damdin Sükhbaatar defeated Chinese forces and took Kyakhta. In May, the White Russian Baron Ungern brought his forces north from Ikh Khuree and were defeated by joint Mongolian People's Army and Red Army forces. On 25 June 1921, the Mongolian People’s Party issued a statement to all Mongolians about its decision to liberate the capital by force. The forces entered the capital on 6 July and declared independence on 11 July. Following advice from the Communist International, the party renamed itself the Mongolian People's Revolutionary Party in 1924.

Armed uprising and purges

In 1928, Mongolian politics turned sharply left and began to adhere to communist ideology. Livestock herds were forcibly collectivized, private trade and transport forbidden and monasteries and the nobility were attacked. With state-run trade and transport unable to function, Mongolia's economy broke down—over seven million head of livestock dead, leading to widespread unrest in 1932. The uprising was quelled in October after the involvement of Mongolian and Soviet armies, tanks and planes.

The first wave of purges began with the 1933 Lkhümbe affair, a manufactured conspiracy linking party secretary Jambyn Lkhümbe with Japanese spy networks. Over 1,500 people were purged, many of whom were executed. Victims included Prime Minister Peljidiin Genden, who was enthusiastic about the liberalisation of the economy. In 1936, Genden was removed from power and executed in the Soviet Union. Khorloogiin Choibalsan, a staunch ally of Joseph Stalin, gained power.

Between 1937 and 1939, a second wave of purges began, with 25,437 people officially arrested and 20,099 executed. The actual number of victims has been estimated at over 35,000 to 100,000. Over 18,000 were lamas, resulting in the virtual destruction of the Buddhist clergy. Between 1940 and 1955, those who were complicit in the earlier purges were themselves purged.

Under Choibalsan's rule, improvements in Mongolia's infrastructure, roads and communications were made with Soviet assistance and steps were taken to improve the country's literacy rate. The 11th party congress was held in December 1947, approving Mongolia's first five-year plan to intensify development of the economy, industry, animal husbandry and agriculture in stages.

In 1952, Khorloogiin Choibalsan died and Yumjaagiin Tsedenbal gained power. Tsedenbal purged his political rivals: Dashiin Damba in 1958–1959, Daramyn Tömör-Ochir in 1962, Luvsantserengiin Tsend in 1963 and the Lookhuuz-Nyambuu-Surmaajav anti-party group in December 1964. His foreign policy was marked by efforts to bring Mongolia into closer cooperation with the Soviet Union and attempts to incorporate the country into the Soviet Union. Tsedenbal's attempts to make Mongolia the 16th Republic of the Soviet Union met strong opposition from other politicians and he was accused of treachery. During the Sino-Soviet split, Tsedenbal sided with the Soviet Union, incurring Chinese wrath. He is remembered for maintaining a path of moderate socialism during the Cold War.

1990 Democratic Revolution

In August 1984, Yumjaagiin Tsedenbal was forced into retirement in a Soviet-sponsored move, allegedly due to age and mental state. Jambyn Batmönkh took power that month as the party and national leader.

The first open pro-democracy demonstration took place in front of the Youth Cultural Center in Ulaanbaatar on 10 December 1989. Over the next few months, the demonstration organizers founded Mongoliin Ardchilsan Kholboo (the Mongolian Democratic Union) and continued to organize demonstrations, rallies, protests and hunger, teachers' and workers' strikes in the capital and the countryside calling for democracy, receiving increased support from Mongolians nationwide.

On 7 March 1990 in Sükhbaatar Square, the Mongolian Democratic Union launched a hunger strike urging the communists to resign. The party's politburo, the governmental authority, eventually yielded to pressure and began negotiating with the pro-democracy leaders. Jambyn Batmönkh, chairman of the party's politburo, decided to dissolve it and resign on 9 March 1990. This paved the way for Mongolia's first multi-party elections.

Behind the scenes, the party considered cracking down on the protesters and formulated a decree to be signed by party leader Batmönkh. Batmönkh opposed it, maintaining his policy of never using force. According to those present, Batmönkh said "I will never sign this. We few Mongols have not yet come to the point that we will make each other's noses bleed", struck the table and left the room.

In the 1990 elections, parties contended for 430 seats in the Great Khural, but opposition parties were unable to nominate enough candidates. The Mongolian People's Revolutionary Party won 357 seats in the Great Khural and 31 of 53 seats in the Small Khural (which was later abolished). The new MPRP government under Dashiin Byambasüren shared power with the democrats, implementing constitutional and economic reforms and adopting a new constitution in 1992. With the collapse of the Soviet Union (which had provided significant economic aid to Mongolia until 1990), the country experienced severe economic problems. In the 1993 Mongolian presidential elections, the MPRP was defeated for the first time in its history—Punsalmaagiin Ochirbat, the candidate backed by the democratic parties, received two-thirds of the vote.

The Democratic Union Coalition, co-led by Tsakhiagiin Elbegdorj as chairman of the Democratic Party, won the 1996 parliamentary elections for the first time. In 2000, 2004 and 2008, the MPRP won the legislative elections and was the ruling party. It formed two coalition governments with the Democratic Party, from 2004 to 2008 and 2008 to 2012. In 2003, the MPRP joined the Socialist International.

The 2008 parliamentary elections were especially controversial, with the MPRP accused of vote-rigging. Protests against the results turned violent on 1 July and a riot broke out at MPRP headquarters which was half-heartedly addressed by authorities—the party headquarters was destroyed by fire. After the riots, a five-day state of emergency was declared by President Nambaryn Enkhbayar for the first time in Mongolia's history. Five civilians died during the emergency: four were shot and the fifth allegedly died from carbon-monoxide poisoning. The Mongolian Minister of Justice estimated that 220 civilians and 108 service members were injured. With the situation tense, the MPRP decided to admit the Democratic Party into the government and formed a coalition. The party demolished its headquarters and built its Independence Palace with government subsidies and donations from party members; the building became fully operational on 26 November 2011.

In the 2009 Mongolian presidential election, Democratic Party candidate Tsakhiagiin Elbegdorj defeated MPRP candidate and incumbent president Nambaryn Enkhbayar. In January 2012, the Democratic Party decided to leave the coalition government before the June parliamentary elections. In the 2012 parliamentary elections, the Democratic Party defeated the MPP; the MPP became the opposition, with 26 seats in parliament. In the 2012 local elections in Ulaanbaatar, the provinces and districts, the MPP was defeated for the first time in Mongolia's history. In the 2013 Mongolian presidential election, the Democratic Party candidate and incumbent president Tsakhiagiin Elbegdorj again defeated the MPP candidate.

The MPP returned to power in 2016, winning an 85-percent majority of parliamentary seats. Prime Minister Chimed Saikhanbileg and parliament chairman Zandaakhuu Enkhbold were defeated, with the MPP's Jargaltulga Erdenebat elected to succeed Saikhanbileg.

Name restoration

The restoration of the party name to the Mongolian People’s Party had been at the core of discussions among party members and at party congresses since 1990. In 2010, it was extensively deliberated at all party levels, resulting on 81.3 percent of the membership supporting the restoration of the Mongolian People’s Party name and 10.7 percent of the membership wanting to deliberate the matter during the 26th party congress. The decision to restore the party's original name was approved by 99.3 percent of the delegates to the 26th party congress. At the congress, the party’s political ideology was refocused from democratic socialism to social democracy.

After the MPRP restored its original name, former Mongolian president and MPRP chairman Nambaryn Enkhbayar founded a new political party in 2010. Enkhbayar received permission to use the name Mongolian People's Revolutionary Party for his new party from the Supreme Court of Mongolia on 24 June 2011.

Victory in the 2020 and 2021 elections 
The MPP won a landslide victory in the 2020 parliamentary election. The party's election platform had six chapters and addresses population income, economic policy, governance, green development policy, Ulaanbaatar city development, and regional development policy. The election result marked the first time a single party has retained an absolute majority in consecutive elections. Previously the Mongolian People's Party and the Democratic Party had taken turns wielding a majority in the State Great Khural or were compelled to form coalition governments.

In June 2021, former prime minister Ukhnaa Khurelsukh of the MPP became the country's sixth democratically elected president after winning the presidential election, further consolidating the party's power in the Mongolian government.

Leaders

 Soliin Danzan (1921)
 Ajvaagiin Danzan (1922–1924)
 Tseren-Ochiryn Dambadorj (1924–1928)
 Bat-Ochiryn Eldev-Ochir (1928–1930)
 Peljidiin Genden (1928–1932)
 Dorjjavyn Luvsansharav (1932–1937)
 Banzarjavyn Baasanjav (1936–1940)
 Yumjaagiin Tsedenbal (1940–1954; 1958–1984)
 Dashiin Damba (February–April 1940; 1954–1958)
 Jambyn Batmönkh (1985–1990)
 Gombojavyn Ochirbat (1990–1991)
 Büdragchaagiin Dash-Yondon (1991–1996)
 Natsagiin Bagabandi (February–June 1997)
 Nambaryn Enkhbayar (1997–2005)
 Miyeegombyn Enkhbold (2005–2007)
 Sanjaagiin Bayar (2007–2009)
 Sükhbaataryn Batbold (2010–2012)
 Ölziisaikhany Enkhtüvshin (2012–2013)
 Miyeegombyn Enkhbold (2013–2017)
 Ukhnaagiin Khürelsükh (2017–2021)
 Luvsannamsrain Oyun-Erdene (2021–current)

Electoral history

Presidential elections

State Great Khural elections

Little Khural elections

Notes

References

External links

  

 
Parties of one-party systems
Political parties in Mongolia